The Yeongdong Expressway  is an expressway in South Korea. Numbered 50, it connects the Seoul area with Gangwon Province.  It is named from Yeongdong, an old name for Gangwon.  The road has its western end in Namdong-gu of Incheon Metropolitan City.  Its eastern end lies in Gangneung near the east coast.   From Incheon to Gangneung, the expressway covers 234.39 kilometers.

History
 24 March 1971 : Singal~Saemal (Yongin~Wonju) segment's construction begin. (Length 104 km)
 1 December 1971 : Singal~Saemal segment opens to traffic. (2 lanes)
 31 December 1973 : Yangji IC (Yongin) opens to traffic.
 26 March 1974 : Saemal~Gangneung segment (Length 97 km) begins construction.
 14 October 1975 : Saemal~Gangneung segment opens to traffic. (2 lanes)
 10 April 1976 : Maseong IC opens to traffic.
 5 January 1977 : Deokpyeong IC opens to traffic.
 15 December 1988 : Connected of Donghae Expressway.
 12 April 1989 : Ansan~Singal Segment (Length 23.2 km) begins construction. (4 lanes)
 27 February 1991 : Seochang~Ansan Segment (Length 27.6 km) begins construction. (6 lanes)
 29 November 1991 : Ansan~Singal segment opens to traffic.
 6 November 1991 : Work begins to widen to 4 lanes in Singal~Wonju segment.
 6 July 1994 : Seochang~Ansan segment opens to traffic.
 12 December 1994 : Singal~Wonju widen to 4 lanes.
 24 November 1995 : Work begins to widen to 4 lanes in Wonju~Woljeong TG.
 30 July 1996 : Work begins to widen to 4 lanes in Woljeong TG~Hoenggye.
 27 December 1996 : Work begins to widen to 4 lanes in Hoenggye~Gangneung.
 January 1997 : Work begins to widen to 6 lanes in Ansan~Singal.
 20 December 1997 : Wonju~Saemal widen to 4 lanes.
 15 July 1999 : Saemal~Woljeong TG widen to 4 lanes.
 22 July 2000 : Woljeong TG~Hoenggye widen to 4 lanes.
 2 May 2001 : Ansan~Singal widen to 4 lanes.
 28 November 2001 : Hoenggye~Gangneung widen to 4 lanes.
 31 October 2007 : Work begins to widen to 8 lanes in Singal~Hobeop.
 29 December 2010 : Singal~Yangji widen to 6 lanes.
 14 December 2011 : Yangji~Hobeop widen to 8 lanes.
 28 March 2013 : Seochang~Gunja widen to 10 lanes.
 3 September 2014 : Ladies' Code suffers a tragic car accident that leads to the deaths of members EunB and RiSe.

Gallery

Compositions

Lanes 
 Yeoju IC ~ Gangneung JC : 4
 Seochang JC ~ Wolgot JC, Gunja JC ~ Ansan IC, Ansan JC ~ N.Suwon IC, Yeoju JC ~ Yeoju IC : 6
 Ansan IC ~ Ansan JC, N.Suwon IC ~ Singal JC, Yongin IC ~ Yeoju JC  : 8
 Wolgot JC ~ Gunja JC, Singal JC ~ Yongin IC : 10

Length 
234.4 km

Limited Speed 
 100 km/h

List of facilities

 IC: Interchange, JC: Junction, SA: Service Area, TG:Tollgate

See also
Roads and expressways in South Korea
Transportation in South Korea

External links 
 MOLIT South Korean Government Transport Department

 
Transport in Gangwon Province, South Korea
Expressways in South Korea
Transport in Gyeonggi Province
Roads in Incheon
Roads in Gyeonggi
Roads in Gangwon